Joseph Lafayette Rawlins (March 28, 1850May 24, 1926) was a delegate to the U.S. Congress from Utah Territory and a Senator from Utah after statehood was achieved.

Rawlins was born at Millcreek in the Provisional State of Deseret (Millcreek is in present-day Salt Lake County, Utah).

Rawlins pursued a classical course at Indiana University in Bloomington. He was a professor at the University of Deseret in Salt Lake City from 1873 to 1875. He then studied law; he was admitted to the bar in 1875, and he commenced practice in Salt Lake City. Raised in the Church of Jesus Christ of Latter-day Saints (LDS Church), young Rawlins disliked the practice of plural marriage and was grateful that his father, Joseph Sharp Rawlins, resisted the pressure of the church to take a second wife. However, when the elder Rawlins did succumb to the wishes of the authorities, his son began questioning the principles and practices of the Latter-day Saints. By the time Rawlins returned to Utah after his first year at college, he was well on the way toward apostasy in his views, and by the time he became Salt Lake's city attorney, he considered himself no longer a member of The Church of Jesus Christ of Latter-day Saints. He never returned to the church.

Rawlins was elected as a Democrat as Utah Territory's delegate to the Fifty-third Congress (March 4, 1893 – March 3, 1895). He was an unsuccessful candidate for reelection in 1894 to the Fifty-fourth Congress. After Utah achieved statehood in 1896, Rawlins was elected by the Utah State Legislature as a Democrat to the United States Senate and served from March 4, 1897, to March 3, 1903. He was an unsuccessful candidate for re-election.

Afterwards, Rawlins continued the practice of law in Utah in partnership with Edgar A. Wedgwood and Samuel R. Thurman. In 1921, he withdrew from public life and active business, and he died in Salt Lake City. He is buried in Salt Lake City Cemetery.

See also
United States Congress Delegates from Utah Territory

References

External links
 

 

1850 births
1926 deaths
Delegates to the United States House of Representatives from Utah Territory
Democratic Party United States senators from Utah
Indiana University alumni
University of Utah faculty
Utah Democrats
Burials at Salt Lake City Cemetery
Former Latter Day Saints